Elachista apicipunctella is a moth of the family Elachistidae found in Europe. It is found in all of Europe (except the Iberian Peninsula and the Balkan Peninsula), east into northern Russia.

Description
The wingspan is .The head is silvery -white. Forewings are dark fuscous, bronzy-tinged; base silvery; a somewhat oblique fascia before middle, a tornal spot, a larger triangular spot beyond it on costa, and a subapical dot silvery white. Hindwings are grey.The larva is pale yellow ; head brown. 

Adults are on wing from late April to July. Normally, there is one generation per year, although there might be a second generation in warmer areas.

The larvae feed on Agrostis, Arrhenatherum elatius, Brachypodium sylvaticum, Calamagrostis arundinacea, Dactylis glomerata, Deschampsia cespitosa, Elymus caninus, Festuca altissima, Festuca gigantea, Glyceria lithuanica, Holcus mollis, Melica nutans, Milium effusum, Poa nemoralis and Poa remota. The larvae create a mine with a corridor widening while descending from the tip of the leaf. They hibernate in the centre of the mine and after winter leave the mine to pupate.

Distribution
It is found in all of Europe (except the Iberian Peninsula and the Balkan Peninsula), east into northern Russia.

References

External links
 Plant Parasites of Europe

apicipunctella
Leaf miners
Moths described in 1849
Moths of Europe
Taxa named by Henry Tibbats Stainton